Erich Gruenberg  (12 October 19247 August 2020) was an Austrian-born British violinist and teacher.  Following studies in Israel, he was a principal violinist of major orchestras, including the Royal Stockholm Philharmonic Orchestra, the London Symphony Orchestra and the Royal Philharmonic Orchestra. He was an international soloist, playing the first performance of Britten's Violin Concerto in Moscow. As a chamber musician, he was leader of the London String Quartet and recorded all Beethoven violin sonatas with pianist David Wilde. He was the lead violinist for The Beatles' album, Sgt. Pepper's Lonely Hearts Club Band. Gruenberg taught at the Royal Academy of Music until age 95, influencing generations of violinists.

Life and career 
Gruenberg was born in Vienna in 1924, the son of Kathrine and Herman Gruenberg. He studied in Vienna and at the Jerusalem Conservatory. He was concertmaster of the Palestine Broadcasting Corporation Orchestra from 1938 to 1945. In 1946, he moved to London where he lived until his death, becoming a British subject in 1950. In 1947 he won the Carl Flesch International Violin Competition, which at the time came with no monetary prize but international recognition. Gruenberg appeared as a soloist in many countries. He gave the first Russian performance of Benjamin Britten's Violin Concerto, in Moscow. In his first concert at the Proms on 11 August 1971, he played Beethoven's Violin Concerto at the Royal Albert Hall, with the BBC Orchestra conducted by Adrian Boult. In a 1983 concert, he played the Proms premiere of Alfred Schnittke's Violin Concerto No. 3, conducted by Edward Downes.

He was Concertmaster of the Stockholm Philharmonic Orchestra from 1955, the London Symphony Orchestra from 1962 to 1965, and the Royal Philharmonic Orchestra from 1972 to 1975. In addition, he was first violin with the London String Quartet (a later ensemble than the London Quartet), and he played chamber music on numerous occasions. Gruenberg taught at the Guildhall School of Music and Drama from 1982 and at the Royal Academy of Music in London from 1989, continuing to teach to age 95. He participated as an international music competition juror many times.

Gruenberg made numerous recordings, including Beethoven's Violin Concerto with the Philharmonia Orchestra and Beethoven's complete violin sonatas with pianist David Wilde. He also played contemporary music such as works by Roberto Gerhard, Berthold Goldschmidt and Olivier Messiaen. In 1976, he played the first recording of David Morgan's 1966 Violin Concerto with the Royal Philharmonic Orchestra conducted by Vernon Handley.

Gruenberg also played on several recordings by The Beatles, including as the lead violinist for their iconic album, Sgt. Pepper, on the songs "A Day in the Life", "She's Leaving Home" and "Within You Without You". The group whimsically had him play wearing a prop gorilla paw on his bow hand.

Gruenberg was made an OBE in 1994. He played a Stradivarius violin, dated 1731.

Gruenberg died in Hampstead Garden Suburb on 7 August 2020 at age 95. Jo Cole, head of strings at the Royal Academy, wrote in a tribute:

References

External links 
 
 
 
 Erich Gruenberg International Who's Who in Classical Music, 2003
 'Obituary: Erich Gruenberg (1924–2020)'.  London Symphony Orchestra blog, 10 August 2020
 David Morgan:  (1966) (from Lyrita SRCD 276, track 5, initially from Lyrita SRCS 97 (1978)

1924 births
2020 deaths
Jewish classical musicians
British classical violinists
British male violinists
Austrian classical violinists
20th-century classical violinists
20th-century British male musicians
21st-century classical violinists
21st-century British male musicians
Male classical violinists
Concertmasters
Academics of the Royal Academy of Music
Honorary Members of the Royal Academy of Music
Austrian Jews
Jews in Mandatory Palestine
Austrian emigrants to Mandatory Palestine
British people of Austrian-Jewish descent
British Jews
British expatriates in Sweden
Musicians from Vienna
Musicians from London
Officers of the Order of the British Empire
Mandatory Palestine emigrants to the United Kingdom